This is a list of destinations served by Cubana de Aviación:

List

References

External links
Official website  

Destinations
Cubana de Aviacion